is a fictional character in the One Piece franchise created by Eiichiro Oda. He serves as the sniper of the Straw Hat Pirates.

He was the fourth member to join Luffy's crew and the third officially after the confrontation they had with Captain Kuro. His dream is to become a great pirate like his father Yasopp, member of the Red-Haired Pirates of "Red-Haired" Shanks. Usopp carried the Straw Hats beating everyone with his 10 ton hammer until water seven when he was replaced with sniper king.

Usopp is recognizable for his long nose, a reference to the fact that he tends to lie a lot. He is a gifted inventor, painter, and sculptor. In combat, he relies primarily on slingshots to fire various kinds of ammunition with great precision in coordination with a set of lies and other weapons giving him a unique fighting style named "The Usopp Arsenal". To help the Straw Hats rescue Nico Robin, he achieves notoriety under his alter-ego , a hero sniper wearing a golden mask and cape. Usopp’s declaration of war on the World Government flag is cited by fans and critics alike as one of the best moments of One Piece. Eventually, after helping the Straw Hats liberate Dressrosa from Don Quixote Doflamingo's rule, he becomes infamous as  due to freeing thousands of people from lives as slave toys, as well as light shining from above onto Usopp whilst underground as he addressed the people he freed.

Creation and conception 
In the original concept art for the Straw Hats, Usopp was labeled the Vice-Captain of the crew. Usopp is based on Pinocchio and his name refers to uso, Japanese for lie and Aesop’s Fables. When asked by a fan what the nationalities of the members of the Straw Hat Pirates would be if One Piece was set in the real world, Oda replied that Usopp would be African. Usopp is the only Straw Hat Pirate to be assigned a continent rather than a nationality.

Usopp has black hair and a long nose and usually wears a dark handkerchief yellow boxes, special shooter glasses, coveralls, brown with a white sash and no shirt underneath (despite wearing a dark green shirt in the Skypiea Saga). Usopp inherited his famous nose of his mother, while the rest of his face resembles that of his father.

After the two-year timeskip, Usopp undergoes a dramatic physical transformation, becoming much more muscular and having longer hair. Usopp also got a new hat and takes his glasses besides sniper in the neck and headphones. He also fights using plants from the Boin Archipelago, which may be inspired by the original concept art of the crew featuring a male botanist.

Personality 
Usopp is one of the most sentimental of the Straw Hat Pirates, and cries or gets angry at times of emotional stress. At the beginning of the series, Usopp was a liar and easily frightened, as well as anxious, insecure, and compulsive. Usopp's cowardice is the result of his fear and insecurity, especially when faced with uncertainty. While Usopp is a coward by nature, he is able to put aside their fears for desperate times: despite danger, Usopp faces his fears for the sake of their friends and sometimes even people he barely knows.

Abilities 
Despite not excelling in physical fitness, Usopp, like his father, has a unique aim with his slingshot, it is able to hit many people without missing once, even at distances at which he can barely see the target. To attack, Usopp uses a slingshot and shoots spherical projectiles which he built and called Boshis. Each Boshi has different effects: some include explosive, smoke, fire, barbed and even hot sauce. Following the visit of the Straw Hats to Skypiea, Usopp has added to its arsenal the Dials who he got there. After the two-year time skip, Usopp uses a plant-based fighting style based on plants from the Boin Archipelago.

Also worth mentioning that Usopp is a great inventor and artist, created the Clima Tact for Nami. When the Straw Hat crew was without a carpenter, Usopp repaired the Going Merry.

Haki
Usopp awakened his Observation Haki during the latter half of the Dressrosa revolt, as he was able to see auras of Luffy, Law, and Sugar, who were in the royal palace, from the old King's Plateau near the Corrida Colosseum. With this, he was able to pinpoint Sugar's location and snipe her down from such a distance

Voice actors 
In the original Japanese version of the entire One Piece anime series (and later spin-offs in the franchise), Usopp is voiced by Kappei Yamaguchi. Jason Griffith and Sonny Strait provide his voice in the 4Kids and Funimation English adaptations, respectively.

Appearances

One Piece manga 
Usopp lived on an island of the East Blue, in the Syrup village. There, along with three kids, Tamanegi, Ninjin, and Piimä, he was the captain of the band of "Usopp Pirates". He was good friends with a girl named Kaya, to whom he told grand stories about his adventures (of course, all lies). After struggling with Luffy and his friends against Black Cat Pirates, Usopp joined the Straw Hat Pirates and gave them their first ship from Kaya, the Going Merry.

Usopp is portrayed to be very close to Luffy and Tony Tony Chopper, and frequently takes care of the Merry. After traveling a while along with the Straw Hat Pirates, during the Water 7 Saga Usopp had an argument with Luffy over the status of their ship the Going Merry and left the crew. Seeing Sanji and Franky try to save Robin made Usopp feel guilty for leaving the crew, so he covered his face with a mask and cape and developed an alter-ego, 

Usopp’s declaration of war on the World Government flag is cited by fans and critics alike as one of the best moments of One Piece. Usopp gets his own bounty of ฿ 30,000,000. In the Post-Enies Lobby Saga, he returned to the crew.

When the crew got separated, Usopp landed on the Greenstone island, where he improved his skills for two years until he was reunited with the crew. On the island of Dressrosa he would liberate a ground of enslaved toys, earning himself a temporary bounty of ฿ 500,000,000 by Doflamingo. This later becomes a permanent bounty of ฿ 200,000,000 and the new epithet .

In other media 
Usopp has made several appearances in other media, including, but not limited to, every One Piece licensed electronic video game to date. He is also a support character in Jump Super Stars. In 2006, he is featured in the Dragon Ball/One Piece/Naruto crossover game Battle Stadium D.O.N. as a playable character.

Usopp will be portrayed by Jacob Romero Gibson in the live-action adaptation of One Piece.

Reception 
Usopp ranked in the Top 10 of the first three Shōnen Jump character popularity polls. In the fourth through seventh popularity polls, Usopp was ranked among the Top 15 most popular characters. Usopp was also prominently involved in six out of the ten most heartbreaking scenes in the manga: the Going Merry’s funeral, Robin saying she wants to live, the Straw Hats departing from Alabasta, the Going Merry rescuing the Straw Hats, the story of Usopp’s mother’s death, and Usopp begging Luffy to rejoin the crew.

In a 2007 Oricon poll, Usopp was voted the 10th most wanted character to receive a spin off amongst all respondents, and the 5th most popular amongst males. In a review of Funimation Entertainment's second DVD release for Mania Entertainment, Bryce Coulter notes that Usopp "brings lots of comic relief to the series", but also comments that he "can be down right annoying at times."

Sean Cubillas of Screen Rant wrote, "As the Straw Hats' resident comic relief, Usopp has made the fans laugh for several years. Whether it's intentional or with his reluctant cowardice, Usopp has had some of the most unique interactions in the story. However, his most iconic scene to date is one that's played totally straight. Adorned as the incredible Sniper King, he's asked by Luffy to declare war on the world itself. Raising his slingshot up high, Sniper King shoots down the World Government's flag in a fiery blaze that turns it to ashes and lights up the whole sky. With just a slingshot, Usopp managed to hit fans pretty deep." In another article, Cubillas stated, "More fiction than fighter, Usopp has skirted his way through the series with tales so detailed and grand that he often uses them to trick his enemies. However, he always saves his best lies for his crew, as he realizes any adventure with Monkey D. Luffy could spell disaster for him. So, like a lot of kids trying to get out of middle school gym, Usopp turns to the doctors' notes. If Usopp doesn't want to go somewhere or if he doesn't want to leave the shop, he'll always say he has some sort of disease, like the fan favorite "Can't-Get-On-This-Island-Disease."

Christian Markle of Comic Book Resources stated that Usopp has had the best character development of the Straw Hats due to his transition from cowardice to dependability and noted how he was the only person to temporarily leave the Straw Hats for personal reasons.

References

Sources

One Piece characters
Comics characters introduced in 1998
Fictional artists
Fictional inventors
Fictional marksmen and snipers
Fictional pirates
Fictional treasure hunters
Fictional tricksters
Male characters in anime and manga
Teenage characters in anime and manga

ca:Llista de personatges de One Piece#Usopp